Mobarakabad Rural District is a rural district (dehestan) in the Central District of Qir and Karzin County, Fars Province, Iran. At the 2006 census, its population was 7,970, in 1,706 families.  The rural district has 33 villages.

References 

Rural Districts of Fars Province
Qir and Karzin County